Ellis is an unincorporated community in the town of Sharon, Portage County, Wisconsin, United States.

History
Originally known as Poland Corners, Ellis was renamed in 1867 when the post office was established. It was named in honor of Albert G. Ellis, who was the mayor of Stevens Point, Wisconsin at the time.

Geography

Ellis is located in central Wisconsin approximately six miles northeast of Stevens Point, approximately four miles north of Custer, and approximately six miles southwest of Rosholt, where State Road 66 and Portage County Road J to the south meets with Ellis Road. Ellis is located on State Road 66 between Portage County Road K to the north and K to the south in Polonia.

Notes

External links
History of Ellis from the Portage County Historical Society

Unincorporated communities in Wisconsin
Unincorporated communities in Portage County, Wisconsin